James Steineke (born November 23, 1970) is a Wisconsin real estate agent and Republican politician.  He was the majority leader of the Wisconsin State Assembly from January 2015 until his resignation from the Assembly in July 2022.  He had represented the Wisconsin's 5th Assembly district since 2011.

Early life and career

Born in Milwaukee, Wisconsin, Steineke attended the University of Wisconsin–Oshkosh and the University of Wisconsin–Milwaukee. He worked as a realtor.

Public office 
He was a member of the board of supervisors for the town of Vandenbroek from 2005 to 2007, and was chairman of the town board from 2007 to 2011.  He also served on the Outagamie County board of supervisors from 2006 to 2011.

Steineke was elected to the Wisconsin State Assembly in 2010 in the Wisconsin's 5th Assembly district, which then comprised much of eastern Outagamie County, the Town of Maple Grove in Shawano County, and part of western Brown County.  He succeeded Democrat Tom Nelson, who had decline running for re-election to seek election as lieutenant governor. He has identified himself as a proponent of limited government and lower taxes.

In November 2020, Steineke was re-elected as the Assembly Majority Leader by his GOP colleagues.

In March 2021, Steineke applauded the conservative majority on the Wisconsin Supreme Court for preventing Governor Tony Evers from extending a face mask mandate intended to halt the spread of the coronavirus.

In January 2022, Steineke announced he would not run for re-election in 2022.  After announcing his retirement, he denounced the 2020 election review recommendations of Michael Gableman, saying that Gableman's suggestion that the legislature could "decertify the 2020 election" "would be the end of our republic as we know it."

References

External links
 
 
 Official website
 Campaign website
 Representative Jim Steineke at Wisconsin Legislature
 5th Assembly District map (2011–2021)

1970 births
21st-century American politicians
American real estate brokers
County supervisors in Wisconsin
Living people
People from Outagamie County, Wisconsin
Politicians from Milwaukee
Republican Party members of the Wisconsin State Assembly
University of Wisconsin–Milwaukee alumni
University of Wisconsin–Oshkosh alumni